In enzymology, a 2-deoxyglucosidase is an enzyme that catalyzes the chemical reaction

a 2-deoxy-alpha-D-glucoside + H2O  2-deoxy-D-glucose + an alcohol

Thus, the two substrates of this enzyme are 2-deoxy-alpha-D-glucoside and H2O, whereas its two products are 2-deoxy-D-glucose and alcohol.

This enzyme belongs to the family of hydrolases, specifically those glycosidases that hydrolyse O- and S-glycosyl compounds.  The systematic name of this enzyme class is 2-deoxy-alpha-D-glucoside deoxyglucohydrolase. Other names in common use include 2-deoxy-alpha-glucosidase, and 2-deoxy-alpha-D-glucosidase.

References 

 

EC 3.2.1
Enzymes of unknown structure